She, Lucifer and I (Spanish: Ella, Lucifer y yo) is a 1953 Mexican comedy film directed by Miguel Morayta and starring Sara Montiel, Abel Salazar and Carlos López Moctezuma.

Cast
 Sara Montiel as Isabel  
 Abel Salazar as Jorge  
 Carlos López Moctezuma as Lucifer / Productor  
 Dalia Íñiguez as Matilde  
 Nono Arsu as himself  
 Luis Manuel Pelayo as Agente  
 Luis Aragón 
 Roberto Spriu 
 Lidia Franco 
 María Herrero 
 Ángel Merino as Eusebio  
 Trío Calaveras as Themselves

References

Bibliography 
 Pierce, David. Motion Picture Copyrights & Renewals, 1950-1959. Milestone, 1989.

External links 
 

1953 films
1953 comedy films
Mexican comedy films
1950s Spanish-language films
Films directed by Miguel Morayta
Mexican black-and-white films
1950s Mexican films